Lee Jung-baik (born August 27, 1986) is a South Korean Greco-Roman wrestler. He competed in the men's Greco-Roman 59 kg event at the 2016 Summer Olympics, in which he was eliminated in the round of 32 by Stig-André Berge.

References

External links
 

1986 births
Living people
South Korean male sport wrestlers
Olympic wrestlers of South Korea
Wrestlers at the 2016 Summer Olympics
21st-century South Korean people